The Dream Chapter: Eternity is the second extended play (EP) by South Korean boy band TXT. It was released on May 18, 2020 by Big Hit Entertainment and Republic Records. It serves as a follow-up to TXT's first studio album The Dream Chapter: Magic (2019). The album contains six songs, including the lead single, "Can't You See Me?". Musically, the album incorporates several genres including funk-pop, dreampop, trap, hip hop and alternative R&B.

Commercially, the album debuted atop Japan's Oricon Albums Chart, becoming their first chart-topper in the country. It debuted at number two on the Gaon Album Chart becoming the band's third consecutive top five album and charted on the Billboard World Albums chart at number four. In July 2020, the album was certified platinum by the Korea Music Content Association (KMCA), becoming their first certification in South Korea since debut. To promote the album, TXT appeared on several South Korean music programs including M! Countdown, Music Bank and Inkigayo.

Background
TXT's comeback was much-anticipated after the band won several rookie awards at year-end Korean award shows, including Mnet Asian Music Awards, MelOn Music Awards, and Golden Disc Awards. On April 28, 2020, Big Hit Entertainment announced the upcoming release of TXT's second EP, The Dream Chapter: Eternity, through a motion graphics video teaser. It follows the group's debut extended play The Dream Chapter: Star and their first studio album The Dream Chapter: Magic which together comprise their successful "The Dream Chapter" series featuring stories of growth.

Music and lyrics
The Dream Chapter: Eternity is thematically a continuation of the band's concept of growth and explores the darker side of youth and friendship. Lyrically, the concept album is about "facing troubles in relationships" and has a theme of self-reflection. The Dream Chapter: Eternity consists of six songs and is musically diverse with a wide range of genres including funk-pop, dreampop, trap, hip hop and alternative R&B. The album's lead single, "Can't You See Me?" is a trap and pop song based on a "thumping pop synth". It features grunge-influenced chord progression and a piano melody. The lyrics detail the confusion and emotional turmoil when a young person encounters a conflicting phase in friendship and relationship. "Drama" is a 
funk-pop song with a "funky" guitar rhythm and an "addictive" melody. It derives from piano and brass instrumentation. The third track on the album is a remake of Light & Salt's 1990 classic single, "Fairy of Shampoo". The jazz-pop song was arranged in dreampop genre with a capella vocal harmonies and synthesizer instrumentation, and features a new rap written by Yeonjun. "Maze in the Mirror" has lyrics co-written by all the band members. It was co-produced by Beomgyu and Big Hit's in-house producer Slow Rabbit. It is an acoustic Britpop track for which guitar, piano and bass provide minimalist instrumentation. The lyrics were inspired by the experiences the group had as trainees. "Puma" is an intense hip hop and trap song with "simple" musical composition. "Eternally" is an alternative R&B song which starts in an acoustic pop style and shifts into darker beats. It features repetitive melody and minimalist fragmented sounds.

Release and promotion

On April 29, the group released a concept trailer of The Dream Chapter: Eternity. It shows the five members sitting together around a round table. Gradually, Soobin begins to distance himself from the rest and finds himself trapped in a transparent glass box. The teaser ends with the words, "Save me". On April 30, a concept photo teaser was released featuring a shabby plush toy in frame of surrealist painter René Magritte's famous painting The Treachery of Images (1929). The caption is a French sentence which translates to 'This is not a teddy bear'. From May 1 to May 4, the group released two versions of concept photos- "Port" and "Starboard", both done up in manner of a social media feed. The "Port" version represents "cracks among friends" while the "Starboard" version depicts "the appearance of the boys longing for eternity." The full album tracklist and digital cover art were released through Big Hit's SNS account on May 5. On May 7, solo teaser videos of Yeonjun and Beomgyu were released for the EP's lead single "Can't You See Me?" On May 8, individual teasers for Taehyun, Huening Kai and Soobin were released. On May 11, the first group teaser for the music video of the lead single "Can't You See Me?" was released. The second group teaser of the music video was released on May 13. On May 15, an album preview was released featuring a snippet of each track along with concept photos and a concept sketch video. The album was released on May 18, 2020, in CD and digital formats. An accompanying music video for the lead single, "Can't You See Me?" was released in conjunction with the release of the album. The video is metaphorical and depicts the group in a darker ambience as opposed to their previous music videos and portrays the pain of friendship becoming distant.

On May 18, a few hours prior to the album release, the group held a media showcase at the Yes24 Live Hall, Gwangjin-gu, Seoul, which was broadcast online on YouTube. Hours after the album's release, a special "Comeback Show", hosted by Mnet was premiered live worldwide, where they performed "Can't You See Me?" and B-side tracks "Drama" and "Fairy of Shampoo" for the first time. The group promoted the album with a series of live performances on various music programs starting with Mnet's M! Countdown on May 21. They also promoted the songs on KBS's Music Bank, SBS 
's Inkigayo, SBS MTV's The Show. and MBC Music's Show Champion. In the second week of promotion, "Can't You See Me?" won first place on The Show and Show Champion. On May 22, TXT made their first appearance on MTV Fresh Out Live where they performed "Can't You See Me?". The group again performed the song on May 27 episode of the variety show Weekly Idol, alongside their previous singles "Crown" and "9 and Three Quarters (Run Away)".

Reception

In his review for NME, Rhian Daly gave the album four out of five stars writing, "Until now, TXT’s output has mostly been bright, breezy and blissfully free from life’s worries, focusing more on fantasy and fun. Taking a different tact, [sic] though, has left them with an EP that is, for the most part, enriched by its embrace of the clashes we all go through." Chris Gillett of South China Morning Post praised the band's songwriting and stated, "In The Dream Chapter: Eternity, the popular K-pop five-piece delivers another solid, varied set of songs to sing along to."

Commercially, The Dream Chapter: Eternity debuted at number two on the Gaon Album Chart, selling over 181,000 copies in its first week and giving TXT their third consecutive top five album in South Korea. The album topped Japan's Oricon Albums Chart on the chart issue dated May 24, 2020, becoming the band's first chart-topper in the country. In addition, the album charted on the Billboard World Albums chart at number four and number nine on the Heatseekers Albums chart. All tracks from the album entered the World Digital Songs chart with "Can't You See Me?" charting at number two. The Dream Chapter: Eternity was the fourth best-selling album of May 2020 in South Korea, selling 247,153 physical copies. In July 2020, the album received a platinum certification from the Korea Music Content Association (KMCA), denoting 250,000 shipments, giving TXT their first certification in the country since debut.

Track listing
Credits adapted from the album's preview video.

Notes

 Segyega bultabeorin bam, urin…  "The night the world burned, we…"
 "Fairy of Shampoo" is a remake of the song by Light & Salt.
 Syampu-ui yojeong
 Geoul sog-ui miro
 Dongmurwon-eul ppajyeonaon pyuma  "Puma fleeing the zoo"

Personnel 
Credits adapted from NetEase Music and Tidal.

 TXTvocals
 Yeonjunbackground vocals 
 Soobinbackground vocals 
 Beomgyuassociated performer , recording arranger 
 Taehyunbackground vocals 
 Huening Kaibackground vocals 
 Jake Torrybackground vocals 
 Melanie Joy Fontanabackground vocals 
 Loren Smithbackground vocals 
 Greg Whipplebackground vocals 
 Durell Anthonybackground vocals 
 Adora background vocals , vocal arrangement , digital editing , recording engineer 
 Julia Rossbackground vocals 
 Supreme Boibackground vocals , vocal arrangement , digital editing 
 Ruuthbackground vocals 
 Slow Rabbit vocal arrangement , keyboard , synthesizer , digital editing , recording engineer , associated performer , recording arranger 
 El Capitxn vocal arrangement , keyboard , synthesizer , digital editing , recording engineer , associated performer , recording arranger 
 Frantsvocal arrangement , keyboard , synthesizer , digital editing 
 Rosaleen Rheeinterpreter 
 Duane Benjaminbackground vocal arrangement 
 Pauline Sköttadditional vocal arrangement 
 Noah Conradvocal arrangement , synthesizer , associated performer , recording arranger 
 "Hitman" Bangassociated performer , recording arranger 
 Sam Klempnerassociated performer , recording arranger 
 Youngguitar 
 Choi Hyun-jongguitar 
 Jeon Seung-hoonbass 
 Jo Jung-hyuntrumpet , flagelhorn 
 nobodybass 
 Sam Klempnerkeyboard , synthesizer , drums 
 Ghstloopdigital editing 
 Kim Cho-rong recording engineer 
 Kim Ji-yeon recording engineer 
 Noah Conrad recording engineer 
 Jung Woo-yeong recording engineer 
 Michel "Lindgren" Schulz recording engineer 
 Erik Reichers recording engineer 
 Yang Ga mixer 
 Phil Tan mixer 
 Hector Castillo mixer 
 Bill Zimmermanassistant mixer 
 Carlos Imperatoriassistant mixer 
 Park Jin-se mixer 
 Jaycen Joshua mixer 
 Jacob Richardsassistant mixer 
 Mike Seabergassistant mixer 
 DJ Rigginsassistant mixer 
 Chris Gehringermastering engineer

Charts

Weekly charts

Monthly charts

Year-end charts

Certifications

Accolades

Release history

References

2020 EPs
Korean-language EPs
Tomorrow X Together albums
Hybe Corporation EPs
Republic Records EPs